× Beallara, abbreviated Bllra. in the horticultural trade, is the nothogenus for intergeneric hybrids between the orchid genera Brassia, Cochlioda, Miltonia and Odontoglossum (Brs. x Cda. x Milt. x Odm.).

Description
The flowers are numerous, about 14 to 16, and last long, between 20 and 30 days. It has fleshy large pseudobulbs. These orchids are commonly cultivated in greenhouses for ornamental purposes, resulting in a huge variety of cultivars of different colors.

Gallery

References

Orchid nothogenera
Oncidiinae
Historically recognized angiosperm taxa